Tymochtee Township is one of the thirteen townships of Wyandot County, Ohio, United States.  The 2010 census found 1,124 people in the township.

Geography
Located in the northern part of the county, it borders the following townships:
Seneca Township, Seneca County - north
Eden Township, Seneca County - northeast corner
Sycamore Township - east
Eden Township - southeast
Crane Township - south
Salem Township - southwest corner
Crawford Township - west
Big Spring Township, Seneca County - northwest corner

No municipalities are located in Tymochtee Township, although the unincorporated communities of McCutchenville and Mexico are located in the northern and northeastern parts of the township respectively.

Name and history
It is the only Tymochtee Township statewide. 
Story of Early Settlers:  Peter Kear, a blacksmith, was born near Tarrytown, New York in 1765. His father was killed by Native Americans allied with the British. Kear married Anna Odell (born 1775) in 1796.  The marriage may have been contentious as Anna's father was a British loyalist and had salt marsh lands granted by King George. In 1812 they and their seven children moved to Ross County, and in 1821 they moved to Wyandot County and built a house on Tymochtee Creek (future Tymochtee Township). As a result of the service by Kear's father in the American Revolutionary War, he was granted 80 acres under the Bounty Grant Deed act as signed by President Monroe on April 14, 1824. Peter died on May 13, 1857. The Kear homestead was made of wood, put together with wooden pegs and had a walnut foundation. It was set back along an old Native American Trail near the creek.  The Kear's second child, Jonathan Kear (born 1799), served as a County Commissioner in Wyandot County.

Government
The township is governed by a three-member board of trustees, who are elected in November of odd-numbered years to a four-year term beginning on the following January 1. Two are elected in the year after the presidential election and one is elected in the year before it. There is also an elected township fiscal officer, who serves a four-year term beginning on April 1 of the year after the election, which is held in November of the year before the presidential election. Vacancies in the fiscal officership or on the board of trustees are filled by the remaining trustees.

References

External links
County website

Townships in Wyandot County, Ohio
Townships in Ohio